Oliver Beer (born 1985) is a British artist who lives and works in Kent and Paris. He graduated in 2009 from the Ruskin School of Drawing and Fine Art, University of Oxford, England and in 2007 from the Academy of Contemporary Music in England.

Biography 

Beer's background in both music and fine art led to an early interest in the relationship between sound and space, particularly the voice and architecture. He has translated his research into fascinating performances in which spectators take part by the mere fact of their presence, and he makes sculptures and videos that embody, literally or metaphorically, the plastic expression of this subtle relationship and the way the human body experiences it. Within and alongside his work with sound, Oliver Beer creates subtle and diverse sculptural, installation and film projects whose provenance sometimes seems biographical; but in which his play with universal – often intimate – concerns draws on shared emotions and perceptions.

Oliver Beer's work has been the subject of many screenings as well as solo and group exhibitions, notably at the Ikon Gallery, Birmingham; the Palais de Tokyo, Fondation Vuitton and Centre Pompidou, Paris; the Musée d'art contemporain, Lyon; Modern Art Oxford; WIELS, Brussels; the Ménagerie de Verre, Paris; the Hebbel Theater in Berlin. Oliver Beer has also held residencies at the Palais de Tokyo, the Watermill Foundation and the Fondation Hermès.

Solo exhibitions 

2019
 Met Breuer, New York, USA, Vessel Orchestra, 2 July – 11 August 2019
 Galerie des Arts Visuels, Quebec City, Canada, Recomposition (Baloo Stripped Bare), 16 February – 21 April 2019
 University of New South Wales Gallery, Sydney, Australia Impossible Composition, 1–23 February 2019 
 Galerie Thaddaeus Ropac, Paris, France, Household Gods, 12 January – 16 February 2019

2018
 Anna Schwartz Gallery, Melbourne Impossible Composition curated by Anaïs Lellouche, 24 March – 21 April 2018  George Eastman Museum, Rochester, NY, USA, 
 Reanimation (Snow White), Video Presentation, 30 October 2018 – 1 January 2019   Ruya Foundation, Baghdad, Iraq
 Reanimation (Alice Falling), Video Presentation, 16 November – 8 December 2018

2017

 THADDAEUS ROPAC GALLERY, Ely House, London New Performance and Sculpture, 28 April 2017 – 29 July 2017
 IKON GALLERY, Birmingham Solo exhibition, 15 March – 14 June 2017

2016

 POMPIDOU CENTRE, Paris Polyphonies curated by Christine Macel 19 October 2016 – 23 January 2017
 NUIT BLANCHE, Paris, 2016 Live Stream, Pont des Arts, 1 October 2016
 VG PRIZE EXHIBITION, London August–September 2016
 FRAENKEL LAB, San Francisco, Reanimation (Snow White), January 2016

2015
 AOYAMA MEGURO, Tokyo, Life, Death and Tennis. Daiwa Art Prize 2015 solo exhibition November–December 2015
 ASAKUSA HOUSE, Tokyo, Deconstructing Sound, Daiwa Art Prize 2015 solo exhibition November–December 2015
 WATERMILL CENTER, New York, Making Tristan, Watermill Center artist in residence September 2015
 KILIC ALI PASA HAMAM, Istanbul, Call to Sound, Galerie Thaddaeus Ropac / Istanbul Biennale September 2015
 DAIWA ART PRIZE 2015, London, Daiwa Foundation Art Prize Exhibition, 12 June – 17 July 2015

2014
 Diabolus in Musica, Galerie Thaddaeus Ropac, (Septembre 2014)
 Rabbit Hole, Oliver Beer, MAC Lyon, (6 Juin – 17 Août 2014) 
 Prospectif Cinéma – Oliver Beer, Pompidou Centre, Paris (22 May 2014)
 Sunday Sessions, MoMA PS1, New York, (6 April 2014)

2013
 Composition for Hearing an Architectural space, Galerie Thaddaeus Ropac, Pantin
 Oliver Beer, Villa Arson, Nice
 Outside-In, Ikon Gallery, Birmingham (permanent installation)
 Out of Shot, Silencio, Paris

2012
 Klang, Palais de Tokyo, Paris

2011
 Pay and Display, Ikon Gallery, Birmingham, UK

2010
 Deep and Meaningful, MurmurART, 20 Hoxton Square, London
 Training, Ikon Gallery, Birmingham (Tower Room)

2009
 Die Budgie History, Dolphin Gallery, Oxford

2008
 The Resonance Project, Abbazia di Farfa, Rome, Italy

2007
 Oliver Beer, La Viande Gallery, London

Public collections 

 Centre national des arts plastiques, France
 FRAC (Fond Régional d'Art Contemporain), Île-de-France, France 
 FRAC, Midi-Pyrénées, Les Abattoirs, Toulouse
 Musée d'art contemporain, Lyon, France
 Musée National d'Art Moderne, Centre Pompidou, Paris
 MACVAL, Ivry-sur-Seine
 Nouveau Musée National de Monaco,
 Museum of Old and New Art (MONA), Australie
 Fondation Louis Vuitton, Paris
 National Museum of Art, Osaka, Japon
 Museum Voorlinden, Wassenaar, Royaume des Pays-Bas
 IKON Gallery, Birmingham, Royaume-Uni
 Zabludowicz 176 Collection, London, Royaume-Uni
 Kramlich Collection, San Francisco, Etats-Unis d'Amérique

Bibliography 

 2014 Rabbit Hall, Oliver Beer, co-edited by Mac Lyon and Galerie Thaddaeus Ropac, texts by Thierry Raspail, Jonathan Wattkins, Rebecca Lamarche-Vadel, Isabelle Bertolotti and Matthieu Lelièvre.
 2014 Oliver Beer : topologies singulières, 02 magazine, text by Ingrid Luquet-Gad
 2013 Oliver Beer, cahier de résidence. Fondation Hermès, text by Clément Dirier, Editions Actes Sud
 2013 Voyage en territoires partagés, dir. Charlotte Moth, including a text by Oliver Beer, Editions Cercle d'Art
 2013 Expérienz, Art Même No. 58
 2013 The Resonance Project, Dante No. 4
 2012 Arts Magazine April issue Oliver Beer: Echologiste by Francois Quintin
 2012 Palais Magazine No. 16, Composition for tuning an architectural space insert. Editions Palais de Tokyo

References

External links 

 Oliver Beer personal artist's website

1985 births
Living people
Alumni of the Ruskin School of Art
21st-century British artists
21st-century male artists
British contemporary artists
21st-century British male artists